William Sellar (21 September 1866 – 10 June 1914) was a Scottish footballer, who played for Queen's Park, Battlefield, Rangers and Scotland.

See also
List of Scotland national football team captains

References

Sources

1866 births
1914 deaths
People from Peterhead
Scottish footballers
Queen's Park F.C. players
Rangers F.C. players
Scotland international footballers
Association football wing halves
Association football forwards
Footballers from Aberdeenshire
FA Cup Final players
Battlefield F.C. players